The High Sheriff of Monaghan was the British monarch's representative in County Monaghan, a territory known as his bailiwick. Selected from three nominated people, he held his office for the duration of a year. He had judicial, ceremonial and administrative functions and executed High Court Writs.

History
The office of High Sheriff was the oldest under the crown. In England it had its establishment before the Norman Conquest. The High Sheriff remained first in precedence in the counties, until the reign of Edward VII, when an Order in Council in 1908 gave the Lord-Lieutenant the prime office under the Crown as the Sovereign's personal representative. In Ireland, the office of High Sheriff was formally abolished by the Court Officers Act 1926.

The High Sheriff of Monaghan was the British Crown's judicial representative in County Monaghan from its creation in 1585 until 1922, when the office was abolished.

High Sheriffs of Monaghan

1590: Ross bane McMahon
1605: Richard (Rhisiart) Blayney
1609–1612: Richard (Rhisiart) Blayney
1660: Captain Foster
1662: Oliver Ancketill
1664: Simon Richardson
1677: James Corry
1682: Matthew Ancketill of Ancketills Grove
1689: Major John McKenna of Monmurry
1692: Henry Richardson of Poplar Vale
1693: Blayney Owen of Newgrove
1698: Henry Evatt of Monaghan Co. Ireland

18th century

19th century

20th century

References

 
Monaghan